Mario Garbuglia (Fontespina, a district of Civitanova Marche, 27 May 1927 – Rome, 30 March 2010) was an Italian set designer. He won the David di Donatello for Best Sets and Decorations, the Nastro d'Argento, and a BAFTA.

Life
Garbuglia's professional debut as a designer came in 1950 with Women Without Names, directed by Géza von Radványi. Over the years, he worked with directors such as Luchino Visconti, Mario Monicelli, Luigi Zampa, and Roger Vadim. He died in 2010 after a long illness.

Filmography
 Women Without Names (1950)
 The Blind Woman of Sorrento (1952)
 Le ragazze di Piazza di Spagna (1952)
 Terza liceo (1954)
 Peccato che sia una canaglia (1954)
 L'arte di arrangiarsi (1954)
 Gli amanti del deserto (1957)
 A Farewell to Arms (1957)
 Arrangiatevi! (1959)
 La grande guerra (1959)
 Rocco e i suoi fratelli (1960)
 I due nemici (1961)
 Boccaccio '70 (1962), "Il lavoro" episode
 Il disordine (1962)
 Il Gattopardo (1963), Nastro d'Argento
 I compagni (1963)
 La mia signora (1964)
 Casanova '70 (1965)
 Vaghe stelle dell'Orsa (1965)
 Caccia alla volpe (1966)
 Se tutte le donne del mondo (1966)
 Le streghe (1967)
 Amare per vivere (1967)
 Capriccio all'italiana (1968), "Che cosa sono le nuvole?" episode
 Barbarella (1968)
 Waterloo (1970), BAFTA Award for Best Production Design
 Brancaleone alle crociate (1970)
 Lady Liberty (1971)
 Carteggio Valachi (1972)
 Polvere di stelle (1973)
 La quinta offensiva (1973)
 Valdez, il mezzosangue (1973)
 Le guerriere dal seno nudo (1973)
 Gruppo di famiglia in un interno (1974)
 Assassinio sul ponte (1975)
 L'innocente (1976)
 L'orca assassina (1977)
 Mogliamante (1977)
 La Cage aux Folles (1978)
 Orient Express (1979), TV series
 La storia vera della signora delle camelie (1981), David di Donatello
 Lion of the Desert (1981)
 La disubbidienza (1981)
 Don Camillo (1983)
 La donna delle meraviglie (1985)
 Io e il Duce (1985), TV film
  (1985)
 Il vizietto III (1985)
 Oci ciornie (1987)
 Giulia e Giulia (1987)
 L'avaro (1990)
 L'assedio di Venezia (1991)
 Botte di Natale (1994)
 Il cielo cade (2000)

References

External links
 

1927 births
2010 deaths
People from Civitanova Marche
Italian set decorators
Italian art directors
Best Production Design BAFTA Award winners
David di Donatello winners
David di Donatello Career Award winners